Cory Ann McGee (born May 29, 1992) is an American professional middle distance runner and Olympian from Pass Christian, Mississippi. At the 2020 Tokyo Olympic Games she finished 12th in the 1500-meters. She was the 2011 Pan American U20 Champion and 2011 USA Juniors Outdoor Champion in the 1500-meters. In May 2022 she ran a personal best of 4:00.34 in the 1500-meters to move to 16th place on the US fastest all-time list.

High School career
McGee attended Pass Christian High School in Pass Christian, Mississippi where she was the 2010 Mississippi Class 4A State Champion in the 800-meters and 1,600-meters events. During her senior year she ran in several high-profile events. On January 29, 2010, she won the high school mile in 4:52.77 at the 103rd Millrose Games in New York City.   Then on Feb 6th, she finished 3rd in the mile running 4:50.06 at the U20 Reebok Indoor Games in Boston, followed by a second-place finish in 4:46.63 at the Boston Nike Indoor Championships. In June, she ran in the Adidas Jim Ryun Girl's Dream Mile at the New York Diamond League.   

In high school, McGee had personal-record times of 2:10.04 (800m) 4:25.88 (1,500m), 4:49 (1,600m), 10:39.57 (3,200m), 17:29 (XC 5K).

Early career

McGee finished 9th at 2009 World Youth Championships in Athletics 1500m (4:30.20). McGee was 2009 1500-meters runner-up USATF World Youth Outdoor Championships in 4:25.98. Following this feat, McGee went on to place ninth in 4:30.20 at the 2009 IAAF World Youth Championships representing USA in Bressanone, Italy.

McGee finished 3rd in the 1500 meters at the 2013 USA Outdoor Track and Field Championships and later obtained the 'B' standard to be able to represent the United States at the 2013 World Championships in Athletics.  At the 2013 World Championships she finished 10th in her heat.

College career
McGee attended the University of Florida from 2010-2014 where she ran track and cross-country. She was an NCAA runner-up and ten-time NCAA Division 1 Track and Field All-American recognized by U.S. Track & Field and Cross-Country Coaches Association (Eight-time All American miler/1500 m and Two-time All-American in Distance Medley Relay).

McGee was 2011 1500 m champ USATF Junior Outdoor Championships in 4:21.91. Following this feat, McGee went on to win at the Junior Pan-Am games representing USA in Miramar, FL.

Professional career

In September 2014, McGee signed with New Balance. As part of the announcement, it was reported McGee, the former Florida Gator and NCAA standout, will be coached by Mark Coogan. She was represented by Chris Layne of Total Sports Management US. Mcgee said, “I’m super excited to work with him. I honestly can’t wait to see my potential under a coach that has such a good ability of getting his athletes to perform to their fullest.”.

McGee finished 7th in the 1500 meters at the 2014 USA Outdoor Track and Field Championships.

McGee finished 11th in the 1500 meters at the 2015 USA Outdoor Track and Field Championships. She finished in fourth place at the Athletics at the 2015 Pan American Games – Women's 1500 metres where she ran 4:11.12.

McGee earned silver in the 1500 meters at 2016 USA Indoor Track and Field Championships, running 4:09.97. She later placed 13th 2016 IAAF World Indoor Championships – Women's 1500 metres. 

McGee finished second in the women's 1500m at the 2020 US Olympic Trials, qualifying for her first Olympic berth.

Competition Record

Sponsorship
McGee has run for New Balance since 2014. She is based and trains in Boulder, Colorado.

References

External links
 
 
 
 
 
 

1992 births
Living people
Track and field athletes from Mississippi
American female middle-distance runners
Athletes (track and field) at the 2015 Pan American Games
University of Florida alumni
People from Pass Christian, Mississippi
Pan American Games track and field athletes for the United States
Athletes (track and field) at the 2020 Summer Olympics
Florida Gators women's track and field athletes
Olympic track and field athletes of the United States
20th-century American women
21st-century American women